Bookanakere Yeddyurappa Raghavendra (born 16 August 1973) is an Indian politician and a member of the 16th Lok Sabha representing Shimoga district of Karnataka and was a member of 14th Karnataka Legislative Assembly. He previously represented Shikaripura Assembly constituency of Karnataka and is a member of the Bharatiya Janata Party (BJP).

In the by-elections to Karnataka Legislative Assembly, he defeated H S Shantaveerappa of Indian National Congress.

In the 15th Lok Sabha elections, he contested against the former Chief Minister of Karnataka Sarekoppa Bangarappa in the Shimoga constituency and won by a margin of 52,893 votes.

Raghavendra is also the Managing Trustee of PES Institute of Technology and Management, Shimoga.

Raghavendra belongs to the Lingayat community, a dominant community in Karnataka. He is the son of Chief Minister of Karnataka B. S. Yediyurappa and late Maithradevi. And he has one brother B.Y. Vijayendra.

References

India MPs 2009–2014
1973 births
Kannada people
Living people
People from Shimoga district
Lok Sabha members from Karnataka
Karnataka MLAs 2008–2013
Bharatiya Janata Party politicians from Karnataka
Karnataka Janata Paksha politicians
India MPs 2019–present
Karnataka MLAs 2018–2023